Lectionary 1966 designated by sigla ℓ 1965 (in the Gregory-Aland numbering). 
It is a Greek minuscule manuscript of the New Testament, written on 181 parchment leaves (26.5 cm by 19.2 cm). Paper added at the end. Paleographically it had been assigned to the 12th century. Written in two columns per page, in 23-24 lines per page.

Description 

The codex contains Lessons from the four Gospels lectionary (Evangelistarium).

History 

Currently the codex is located in the Kenneth Willis Clark Collection of the Duke University (Gk MS 10)  at Durham.

See also 

 List of New Testament lectionaries
 Biblical manuscripts
 Textual criticism

References

Further reading 

 Clark, Kenneth Willis, "Greek Manuscripts in the Duke University Library", pp. 3-8. 
 C. R. Gregory, "Textkritik des Neuen Testamentes", Leipzig, 1900-1909.

External links 

 Lectionary 1965 at the Kenneth Willis Clark Collection of Greek Manuscripts 

Greek New Testament lectionaries
12th-century biblical manuscripts
Duke University Libraries